Undy Athletic Football Club is a Welsh association football club based in the village of Undy, Monmouthshire. The club plays in the Ardal South East league (Tier 3).

History
The club was formed in 1947, playing at local level in South Wales and winning the Argus Cup 3 times in 15 years. However, in 1962 the club disbanded as a result of financial difficulties. In 1970, the club reformed and maintained a consistent existence in the local leagues, winning the Gwent County League Division One in 2011 and reaching the Welsh Football League for the first time, entering in Division Three. They won promotion at the first attempt, and then under the guidance of Manager Laurence Owen, sealed their highest ever position in 2016 when they finished third in Division Two and earned promotion to Welsh Football League Division One, finishing in the top half of the top division in their first two seasons, step 2 on the Welsh football pyramid. This season also saw the first international footballer to play for Undy, with Gibraltar international Jamie Coombes signing for the club in February 2017. Laurence Owen brought an end to 32 years in club management by announcing his retirement at the end of 2017–18 after another successful campaign, he was replaced by Reserve team manager Jason Pritchard .

Undy also have a reserve team who play in the Welsh league reserve division under manager Luke Smith and a successful 3rd team currently playing in East Gwent Division 1 .

Youth team

Undy A.F.C. also supports a junior section that has teams in age groups from Under 6 to Under 18. Teams play in the Gwent County and East Gwent Leagues and have their home matches on the club pitches. The junior section also hosts a popular football tournament in June that attracts around 150 teams from all over South Wales and beyond each year.

The club's current under-18 side is managed by Christopher Swann with assistance from Dan Tozer and Henry Mollard.

Honours
 Gwent County League Division One: 2010–11
 Welsh Football League Division Three: 2011–12
 Highest League Finish: 7th, Welsh Football League Division One, 2016–17

Current squad 

 (c)

References

External links
Official website

Football clubs in Wales
Sport in Monmouthshire
1947 establishments in Wales
Gwent County League clubs
Welsh Football League clubs
Cymru South clubs